The 1958 NSWRFL season was the 51st season of the New South Wales Rugby Football League, Australia's first rugby league football competition. Ten teams from across Sydney competed for the J. J. Giltinan Shield during the season, which culminated in a grand final between St. George and Western Suburbs.

Season summary
Having been wooden spooners in 1955, Wests embarked on a massive spending spree to recruit internationals Harry Wells, Kel O'Shea, Arthur Summons, Dick Poole, Darcy Henry and Ian Moir over a five-year period. The fruits of this labour began to show in 1958 when they finished in second place for the minor premiership and posed a challenge to St. George in the finals.

Harry Bath was the competition's leading goal scorer in 1958, with his St George teammate Eddie Lumsden the leading try scorer. Bath shattered the Dragons club's point scoring record with 225 season points from three tries and 108 goals.

Nineteen-year-old Reg Gasnier, later to be honoured as one of the Australian game's Immortals, made his Third Grade debut in 1958 and was immediately noticed, regularly scoring length-of-the-field tries.

The 1958 season also saw the retirement from the League of future Australian Rugby League Hall of Fame inductee, Clive Churchill.

Teams

Ladder

Finals
The developing Western Suburbs side which would become such a force at the beginning of the 1960s, was already building around the class of internationals Keith "Yappy" Holman, Harry "Dealer" Wells, Kel "Twigs" O'Shea along with their hard men Neville "Boxhead" Charlton, Mark Patch and fiery nineteen-year-old Peter Dimond. With a simple game plan of "retaliate first", the Magpies' aggression in the semifinal stunned St George who were coming off a coasting run through the end of the season. In spite of having beaten Wests twice in the regular season, the Dragons were mauled by them 34–10 in the major-semi final with Dimond dominating his opposite five-eighth Peter Carroll and forcing the Dragons to a sudden death final against Balmain for the right to defend their title.

The lessons from this loss sat heavily with St George – how an early forward onslaught designed to knock the spirit of the rival pack could determine the course of the entire game. For the next eight years, in all of their finals appearances, the Dragons would play a deliberate tactic of giving the opposition the ball in the first fifteen minutes and setting about demoralising them with brutal defence.

Grand Final

In an effort to negate Peter Dimond, Saints dropped Peter Carroll for the Grand Final, selecting lock and hard hitting defender, Brian Clay at five-eighth. From the kick-off, the record crowd saw a furious St George team lay into Wests. High tackles and punches were the order of the day and referee Darcy Lawler penalised the Dragons seventeen times to Wests seven.

Wests were unable to counter the onslaught which saw a ruthless Dragon defence advancing upon them at every opportunity although the score remained close for most of the match. Eventually with the Magpies subdued, Norm Provan and Bob Bugden cut loose, with Provan scoring two tries and Bugden snatching an intercept try near the end. Saints won the fight, and the match. For eighty minutes Clay was all over Dimond who ended the match dazed and bleeding.

The Sydney Morning Herald described the match as the most “savage” game of the season.

 St George 20 (Tries: N. Provan 2, Bugden, Lumsden. Goals: Bath 4.)

Wests 9 (Tries: Russell. Goals: Russell 3  )

Player statistics
The following statistics are as of the conclusion of Round 18.

Top 5 point scorers

Top 5 try scorers

Top 5 goal scorers

Great Britain Lions Tour

From May until August, the Great Britain Lions toured Australia and New Zealand. In Australia they played the three Test Ashes series against Australia as well as games against various sides including Sydney Firsts, New South Wales and a Sydney Representative Colts side that featured a young Reg Gasnier.

The team was coached by Jim Brough and was captained was Alan Prescott.

Note: Other than the Ashes Tests, only games in NSW listed

References

External links
 1958 Season Rugby League Tables
 Writer, Larry (1995) Never Before, Never Again, Pan MacMillan, Sydney
Results:1951-60 at rabbitohs.com.au
1958 J J Giltinan Shield at rleague.com
NSWRFL season 1958 at rugbyleagueproject.org
1958 Final at Dragons History site

NSW
New South Wales Rugby League premiership